Spotted lunulae is a distinctive change that occurs with alopecia areata.

See also
Lunulae

Notes

References
Cohen PR: The Lunula. J Am Acad Dermatol 1996;34:943.
Shelley WB: The spotted lunula: a neglected nail sign with alopecia areata. J Am Acad Dermatol 1980;2:385.

 
Conditions of the skin appendages